Edward Willes (6 November 1723 – 14 January 1787) was an English barrister, politician, and judge.

Early life and family 
Willes was the second surviving son of Sir John Willes, the Chief Justice of the Common Pleas, and his wife Margaret Brewster. He was the younger brother of John Willes MP. Edward Willes (1702-1768), Chief Baron of the Irish Exchequer, was his second cousin.
 
Willes was educated at Worcester College, Oxford and at Lincoln's Inn where he was called to the bar in 1747, and became a bencher in 1757.

In 1752, he married Anne, the daughter of Rev. Edward Taylor of Sutton, Wiltshire. They had 3 sons.

Little Grove
In 1767, Willes purchased Little Grove (now demolished) in East Barnet, the house built for John Cotton of the Middle Temple in 1719. He commissioned Capability Brown to design the gardens.

Career 
Willes became a King's Counsel in 1756, served as Solicitor General for England and Wales from 1766 to 1768, and then became a justice of the Court of King's Bench from 1768 until his death in 1787, aged 63.

He was a member of parliament (MP) for Old Sarum in 1747, for Aylesbury from 1747 to 1754, and for Leominster from 1767 to 1768.

References 
 

1723 births
1787 deaths
Alumni of Worcester College, Oxford
Members of Lincoln's Inn
Solicitors General for England and Wales
18th-century King's Counsel
Justices of the King's Bench
Members of the Parliament of Great Britain for English constituencies
British MPs 1741–1747
British MPs 1747–1754
British MPs 1761–1768